The Senior women's race at the 1991 IAAF World Cross Country Championships was held in Antwerp, Belgium, at the Linkeroever Racecourse on March 24, 1991.   A report on the event was given in The New York Times.

Complete results, medallists, 
 and the results of British athletes were published.

Race results

Senior women's race (6.425 km)

Individual

†: Athlete marked in the results list as nonscorer.

Teams

Note: Athletes in parentheses did not score for the team result

Participation
An unofficial count yields the participation of 126 athletes from 30 countries in the Senior women's race.  This is in agreement with the official numbers as published.

 (1)
 (1)
 (4)
 (6)
 (4)
 (5)
 (1)
 (1)
 (6)
 (6)
 (2)
 (5)
 (6)
 (6)
 (6)
 (5)
 (2)
 (5)
 (5)
 (6)
 (1)
 (6)
 (6)
 (1)
 (6)
 (6)
 (3)
 (7)
 (6)
 (1)

See also
 1991 IAAF World Cross Country Championships – Senior men's race
 1991 IAAF World Cross Country Championships – Junior men's race
 1991 IAAF World Cross Country Championships – Junior women's race

References

Senior women's race at the World Athletics Cross Country Championships
IAAF World Cross Country Championships
1991 in women's athletics